Walter III may refer to:

 Walter III, Count of Brienne
 Walter III of Caesarea
 Walter III of Châtillon
 Walter III de Clifford